Bird Murphy Pearson (or Byrd Murphy Pearson) was a Florida lawyer, planter and a Democratic politician who served on the Florida Supreme Court from 1856 to 1859, one of the first to be popularly elected. He replaced  Thomas Baltzell as Chief Justice. He was born in 1803. He died October 9, 1859.

Person was born in Union District, South Carolina, in 1803. He graduated from South Carolina College and read law. Little is known of his law practice, though he served as a state solicitor in South Carolina. He lived for a time in Faunsdale, Alabama, where he built a plantation. He moved to a Hernando County plantation near Brooksville, Florida in 1845. The plantation he built at what is now Chinsegut Hill Manor House is on the National Register of Historic Places.

An ardent proponent of states' rights, slavery, and secession, he was a delegate to the 1850 Nashville Convention. In 1851, he moved to Jacksonville. It was felt that a bid to run for the Florida Supreme Court would be premature in 1853, as the State's sentiments were too pro Union. In 1855, he ran to fill the vacancy left by the death of Thomas Douglas. Ill health forced him to not seek reelection. He died in Jacksonville on October 9, 1859.

References
Manley, Walter W., Brown, E. Canter. and Rise, Eric W. The Supreme Court of Florida and Its Predecessor Courts, 1821-1917. pp 164–165. University Press of Florida. Gainesville, Florida. 1997. eBook . . at Netlbrary. Online. May 14, 2008.
The Political Graveyard, Pearson
Justices of the Florida Supreme Court

1803 births
1859 deaths
People from Union County, South Carolina
American planters
People from Jacksonville, Florida
Florida lawyers
American proslavery activists
Chief Justices of the Florida Supreme Court
People from Hernando County, Florida
U.S. state supreme court judges admitted to the practice of law by reading law
American white supremacists
19th-century American judges
19th-century American lawyers